Samuel Osiah Thier (born June 23, 1937) is professor of Medicine and Health Care Policy at Harvard University. He earned his medical degree at the State University of New York Upstate Medical University in 1960. He previously served as the president of Brandeis University from 1991–1994 and the president of the Massachusetts General Hospital from 1994-96.

Thier is an authority on internal medicine and kidney disease and is also known for his expertise in national health policy, medical education and biomedical research.

Early life and education
Thier was born in Brooklyn, New York City, in 1937. He attended Cornell University, and then earned a Doctor of Medicine degree in 1960 from the State University of New York Upstate Medical Center at Syracuse. In addition, he has received sixteen honorary degrees and the UC Medal of the University of California, San Francisco.

Career
Thier began his career at the Massachusetts General Hospital, progressing from Intern in 1960, to Chief Resident in Medicine in 1966, to Assistant in Medicine and Chief of the Renal Unit in 1967.

He served as Associate Director of Medical Services at the Hospital of the University of Pennsylvania and then Vice Chairman of the Department of Medicine at the University’s School of Medicine.

In 1975, he became Chairman of the Department of Internal Medicine at Yale University School of Medicine, where he was the Sterling Professor, and Chief of Medical Service at Yale-New Haven Hospital.

Thier served as President of the Institute of Medicine, United States National Academies, from 1985 to 1991.

Thier was the President of Brandeis University from 1991 to 1994. At Brandeis, he was largely credited with improving the financial situation of the institution.

Thier was the President of Massachusetts General Hospital. He continues to teach at Massachusetts General Hospital and Brigham and Women’s Hospital.

Partners HealthCare

In 1994 Thier became president of the newly formed Partners HealthCare, founded by Brigham and Women’s Hospital (BWH) and Massachusetts General Hospital (MGH). From 1996 to 2002 he was CEO of Partners HealthCare. Thier led Partners' efforts to demand higher payments from insurance companies. In May 2000 Thier and William C. Van Faasen, CEO of Blue Cross Blue Shield of Massachusetts—the state's biggest health insurer—agreed to a deal that raised insurance costs all across Massachusetts. They agreed that Van Faasen would substantially increase insurance payments to Partners HealthCare doctors and hospitals, largely correcting the underpayments of the previous 10 years. Prior to this, Thier had informed all three managed care companies that they would all be paid at the same rate.

Boards
Thier has had many leadership positions, including membership on the Board of Trustees of Yale-New Haven Hospital, Johns Hopkins University, and Cornell University. Thier continues to teach several undergraduate lectures at Brandeis University each semester. In 2007 he served as director of Merck & Company, the Charles River Laboratories, The Commonwealth Fund and the Federal Reserve Bank of Boston. In 2014, Thier received from Merck alone $605,306.23.

Awards and honors
He was named Honorary Fellow of the New York Academy of Medicine, and is a Fellow of the American Academy of Arts and Sciences and a member of the American Philosophical Society. He received the John Stearns Medal for Distinguished Contributions in Medicine from the New York Academy of Medicine in 2005.

See also

 Brandeis University

References

Living people
1937 births
People from Brooklyn
Harvard Medical School faculty
State University of New York Upstate Medical University alumni
Cornell University alumni
Johns Hopkins University people
University of Pennsylvania faculty
Yale University faculty
Yale Sterling Professors
Presidents of Brandeis University
20th-century American Jews
Members of the American Philosophical Society
21st-century American Jews
Members of the National Academy of Medicine